The 1967–68 Southern Football League season was the 65th in the history of the league, an English football competition.

Chelmsford City won the championship, winning their second Southern League title, whilst Bedford Town, Kettering Town, Rugby Town and Worcester City were all promoted to the Premier Division. Twelve Southern League clubs applied to join the Football League at the end of the season, but none were successful.

Premier Division
The Premier Division consisted of 22 clubs, including 18 clubs from the previous season and four new clubs, promoted from Division One:
Dover
Hastings United
Margate
Stevenage Town

At the end of the season Stevenage Town left the league and folded, thus Burton Albion Albion were reprieved from relegation.

League table

Division One
After three clubs left the league at the end of the previous season, Division One reverted to 22-clubs format, including 17 clubs from the previous season and five new clubs:
Four clubs relegated from the Premier Division:
Bath City
Bedford Town
Folkestone Town
Worcester City

Plus:
Brentwood Town, joined from the Metropolitan League

At the end of the season Folkestone Town was renamed Folkestone.

League table

Football League elections
Alongside the four League clubs facing re-election, a total of 15 non-League clubs applied for election, including twelve Southern League clubs. All four League clubs were re-elected.

References
RSSF – Southern Football League archive

Southern Football League seasons
S